Cape Coast South is one of the constituencies represented in the Parliament of Ghana.

It elects one Member of Parliament (MP) by the first past the post system of election. 

Cape Coast South is located in the Cape Coast Metropolitan Assembly of the Central Region of Ghana.

Members of Parliament

References 

Parliamentary constituencies in the Central Region (Ghana)